Keratin, type I cytoskeletal 4 also known as cytokeratin-4 (CK-4) or keratin-4 (K4) is a protein that in humans is encoded by the KRT4 gene.

Keratin 4 is a type II cytokeratin. It is specifically found in differentiated layers of the mucosal and esophageal epithelia together with keratin 13. Mutations in the genes encoding this protein have been associated with White Sponge Nevus, characterized by oral, esophageal, and anal leukoplakia.

References

Further reading

Keratins